Elections Newfoundland & Labrador is the non-partisan agency in Newfoundland & Labrador, of the legislative assembly charged with running provincial elections.

References

External links

Newfoundland and Labrador
Politics of Newfoundland and Labrador